Noel Rhys (23 February 1888 – 1971) was a British wrestler. He competed at the 1912, 1920 and the 1924 Summer Olympics.

References

External links
 

1888 births
1971 deaths
Olympic wrestlers of Great Britain
Wrestlers at the 1912 Summer Olympics
Wrestlers at the 1920 Summer Olympics
Wrestlers at the 1924 Summer Olympics
British male sport wrestlers
Sportspeople from London